Wasa may refer to any of the following:

Wasa, British Columbia, a settlement in the East Kootenay region of British Columbia
Wasa Lake, a place in British Columbia, Canada
Wasabröd, a brandname used by the Swedish company AB Wasabröd
IK Wasa, a Swedish sports club
Wasa Research Station, a Swedish research facility in Antarctica, established in 1988/1989
Vasa (ship), 17th-century Swedish warship, formerly spelled Wasa
SS Wasa (1907) a Swedish cargo ship launched in 1907, sold to Norway in 1925 and renamed SS Henry 
Vaasa or Vasa, a town in Finland with a large Swedish-speaking minority, formerly spelled Wasa
Wasa Line, a former Finnish shipping company
Legion Wasa, a Swedish political party
Wasa 30, a Swedish sailboat
Wasa Amenfi West District, a district in the Western Region of Ghana
Wasa people, a people of Ghana
Wasa language, a variety of the Akan languages of Ghana and eastern Ivory Coast
Wasa (Tanzanian ward), a Tanzanian ward in Iringa Rural district
Wasa, Cameroon, a town in Extrême-Nord region

WASA may refer to:
Water Supply and Sewerage Authority, Bangladesh
District of Columbia Water and Sewer Authority
Water and Sewerage Authority of Trinidad and Tobago
Western Action Shooting Association
Western Australia Softball Association
WASA-LD, a low-power television station (channel 2, virtual 24) licensed to serve Port Jervis, New York, United States

See also
Wasa Wasa, an album by Edgar Broughton Band
Wasa, an alternate spelling of the name of the Swedish House of Vasa
Vasa (disambiguation)